Caesar Carpentier Antoine (1836–1921) was a soldier, businessman, editor, and politician in Louisiana. He served as a state senator for Caddo Parish from 1868 until 1872 when he was elected the third of three African American Republicans to serve as Lieutenant Governor of the U.S. state of Louisiana.

Legacy and honors
In 2008, C. C. Antoine Celebration was established as an annual event during Black History Month in Shreveport.
A tombstone was dedicated at Antoine's gravesite on Memorial Day, 31 May 1999.
In 1984, a Shreveport park was named for Antoine and a sculpture of him was installed in it.
Antoine's house in Shreveport is a state historic site for preservation.

See also 
 List of minority governors and lieutenant governors in the United States

References

"Caesar Carpentier Antoine". A Dictionary of Louisiana Biography, Vol. 1 (1988), p. 16
John W. Blassingame, Black New Orleans, 1860-1880 (1973)
Dorothea Olga McCants, ed., Our People and Our History (1973)
Charles Vincent, Black Legislators in Louisiana during Reconstruction (1976)
Rayford W. Logan and Michael R. Winston, eds., Dictionary of American Negro Biography (1982)

1836 births
1921 deaths
Republican Party Louisiana state senators
African-American state legislators in Louisiana
Politicians from Shreveport, Louisiana
Businesspeople from New Orleans
Politicians from New Orleans
Barbers
Lieutenant Governors of Louisiana
African Americans in the American Civil War
19th-century American newspaper editors
American planters
School board members in Louisiana
African-American politicians during the Reconstruction Era
Union Army officers
20th-century African-American people